The Shire of Kowree was a local government area in western Victoria, Australia.

History

Kowree was first incorporated as a road district on 24 June 1862, and became a shire on 26 January 1872. It annexed the South Riding of the Shire of Lowan on 29 May 1894, which was added to its North Riding.

On 20 January 1995, the Shire of Kowree was abolished, and along with the Shire of Kaniva and parts of the Shires of Arapiles and Glenelg, was merged into the newly created Shire of West Wimmera. The Black Range and Toolondo Reservoir districts were transferred to the newly created Rural City of Horsham, while a small unpopulated section was transferred to the Shire of Southern Grampians, created earlier in September 1994.

Wards

The Shire of Kowree was divided into four ridings, each of which elected three councillors:
 Central Riding
 East Riding
 North Riding
 West Riding

Towns and localities
 Apsley
 Bringalbert
 Douglas
 Edenhope*
 Goroke
 Gymbowen
 Harrow
 Minimay
 Rocklands
 Toolondo
 Wombelano

* Council seat.

Population

* Estimates in 1958, 1983 and 1988 Victorian Year Books.

References

External links
 Victorian Places - Kowree Shire

Kowree